TTS may refer to:

Places
 Taman Tasik Semenyih, Kuala Lumpur, Malaysia, a student town
 Toba Tek Singh District, a district in the Punjab province of Pakistan
 Toba Tek Singh Tehsil
 Toba Tek Singh, Punjab, Pakistan

Schools
 Tamil Nadu Theological Seminary
 Tanglin Trust School, Singapore
 Thomas Telford School, a City Technology College in Telford, Shropshire

Science
 Temporary threshold shift, auditory fatigue
 Tarsal tunnel syndrome, foot condition
 Three-taxon analysis, a method of phylogenetic reconstruction
 Time-temperature superposition, in polymer physics
 Time translation symmetry, in physics
 Transdermal therapeutic system, a drug delivery system
 T Tauri star, a class of variable stars
 Thrombosis with thrombocytopenia syndrome, a rare medical condition of blood clotting yet with low platelet counts

Technology
Text-to-speech
Teletypesetter
 Transaction Tracking System, in Novell NetWare
 Technology Transformation Services, an organizational sub-unit of the U.S. General Services Administration

Other
 Audi TTS, a car
 Girls' Generation-TTS, subgroup of South Korean musical group Girls' Generation
 Tower Transit Singapore, a bus operating company in Singapore
 Tanker Transport Services BV, a Dutch barge tanker transportation company
 Telegraphic transfer, selling rate in Japan
 Tabletop Simulator, an independent video game letting you play tabletop games
 Trader tax status, a form of business in the U.S. for securities trading